Ken Kashiwahara (July 18, 1940) is a broadcast journalist. He was a correspondent for ABC from 1974 to 1998, and was one of the first Asian American journalists to appear on national television.

Early life and education 
Kashiwahara was born in Waimea, Kauai on July 18, 1940. His parents were both teachers. When he was ten years old his family moved to Okinawa, but they returned to the United States and lived in Pennsylvania when Kashiwahara was a teenager. He later moved to Maryland and graduated from Bethesda Chevy Chase High School in 1958, then went on to attend Washington and Jefferson College. He left after two years after facing significant racism. He returned to Hawaii and studied pre-medicine at the University of Hawaii until he became interested in broadcasting and transferred to San Francisco State College. He completed his bachelor's degree in 1963.

Career 
After graduating from college Kashiwahara enlisted in the Air Force, where he served as an information officer for five years. His first civilian position was as a political reporter at KGMB. He became a news anchor in 1971. In 1972 Kashiwahara got a position at KABC and moved to Los Angeles. He covered stories internationally and was one of the last American journalists to leave Saigon in 1975. That same year he was named chief of ABC's Hong Kong bureau, and served in that position until 1977, when he returned to the United States. He later became the San Francisco bureau chief. 

In 1978 Kashiwahara met his wife, Lupita Aquino, while covering a story on opposition to Ferdinand Marcos in the Philippines. Aquino's brother, Benigno Aquino Jr., was a political prisoner at the time. He was later exiled. When Aquino returned to the Philippines with Kashiwahara in 1983, he was assassinated.

Kashiwahara won Emmy Awards for his stories in 1986 and 1988. In 1993 Kashiwahara was awarded a Lifetime Achievement Award from the Asian American Journalists Association. Kashiwahara retired in 1998.

References 

1940 births
Living people

People from Kauai
American journalists
Emmy Award winners
Bethesda-Chevy Chase High School alumni
San Francisco State University alumni